XHWD-FM is a radio station on 95.9 FM located in Ciudad Miguel Alemán, Tamaulipas, Mexico, which offers a regional Mexican format.

History

XEWD-AM received its concession on January 22, 1953. Initially operating with 2,000 watts during the day, XEWD has never changed concessionaires in its history.

It migrated to FM as XHWD-FM 95.9 in 2019. At that time, the station was being operated by Grupo GAPE. In November 2019, La Pistolera, a Regional Mexican outlet that had been broadcasting from KRGX 95.1 across the border in Rio Grande City, Texas, moved from 95.1 to XHWD-FM.

External links

References

1953 establishments in Mexico
Radio stations established in 1953
Radio stations in Tamaulipas
Regional Mexican radio stations
Spanish-language radio stations